The 2016–17 Superleague is the 25th season of the Russian Handball Super League, Russian's top-tier handball league. A total of twelve teams contest this season's league. Chekhovskiye Medvedi are the defending champions.

Format
The competition format for the 2016–17 season consists of a home-and-away double round-robin system. The first eight teams qualifies for play-offs, while the last four plays relegation round. The last team of this relegation round is relegated.

Teams

The following 12 clubs compete in the Superleague during the 2016–17 season.

Regular season

Standings

Play-offs

Relegation group

References

External links
 Russian Handball Super League

Handball competitions in Russia
Russia
Handball
Handball